Castelsantangelo sul Nera is a comune (municipality) in the Province of Macerata in the Italian region of Marche, located about  southwest of Ancona and about  southwest of Macerata. The source of the Nera River is located in the communal territory.

References

Cities and towns in the Marche